Carlos Rodríguez may refer to:

 Carlos A. Rodriguez, Cuban-born American business executive
 Carlos Alfredo Rodríguez (born 1947), Argentine economist
 Carlos Manuel Rodríguez Santiago (1918–1963), beatified Puerto Rican Roman Catholic layman
 Carlos Páez Rodríguez (born 1953), Andes plane crash survivor

Entertainment 

 Carlos Rodríguez Cárdenas (born 1962), Cuban artist
 Carlos Rodríguez (film director) (born 1966), Spanish film director
 Carlos Rodríguez (musician) (born 1972), Argentine singer

Politics 

 Carlos Rafael Rodríguez (1913–1997), Cuban politician
 Carlos Rodriguez (CUT), president of the Central Union of Workers, Colombia
 Carlos Rodríguez Mateo (born 1965), Puerto Rican politician and former mayor of Salinas
 Carlos Sosa Rodriguez (1912–1997), President of the United Nations General Assembly in 1963

Sports

Association football 

 Carlos Alberto Rodríguez (born 1997), Mexican footballer
 Carlos Alberto Rodriguez Sanchez (born 1996), Mexican footballer
 Carlos Hernández (footballer, born 1996), Colombian footballer
 Carlos Andrés Rodríguez, player for Ecuador at the 2007 South American U-20 Championship
 Carlos Eduardo Rodríguez (footballer) (born 2000), Venezuelan footballer
 Carlos Rodríguez (Argentine footballer) (born 1990), Argentine footballer
 Carlos Rodríguez (Uruguayan footballer) (born 1990), Uruguayan footballer
 Carlos Rodríguez (Panamanian footballer) (born 1990), Panamanian footballer
 Carlos Felipe Rodríguez (born 1989), Mexican goalkeeper
 Carlos Gerardo Rodríguez (born 1985), Mexican midfielder
 Carlos Rodríguez (Chilean footballer) (born 1995), Chilean footballer
 Carlos Javier Rodríguez (born 1992), Spanish footballer
 Carlos Rodríguez (footballer, born 1995), Colombian professional footballer
 Carlos Rodríguez Chaires (born 1994), Mexican footballer
 Carlos Rodríguez (footballer, born 1988), Spanish footballer
 Carlos Rodríguez (footballer, born 1980), Spanish footballer

Other sports 

 Carlos Rodríguez (baseball) (born 1967), Mexican baseball player
 Carlos Rodríguez (baseball, born 2001), Nicaraguan baseball player
 Carlos Rodríguez (boxer) (born 1939), Venezuelan Olympic boxer
 Carlos Rodríguez (cyclist) (born 2001), Spanish road cyclist
 Carlos Rodríguez (darts player) (born 1979), Spanish darts player
 Carlos Rodríguez (fencer) (born 1978), Venezuelan fencer
 Carlos Rodríguez (sport shooter) (1909–1986), Mexican Olympic shooter
 Carlos Rodríguez (tennis coach), Argentinian-Belgian tennis coach

See also 

 Carlos Rodrigues (disambiguation)